Thanlyin Bridge No. 2 is a bridge that link the cities of Thanlyin and Yangon in Myanmar. The  bridge link the Dagon Seikkan township on the Yangon side and the Kalawe village on the Thanlyin side. Its maximum loading capacity is 75 tons.

The bridge will extend Highway 2 to Thanlyin.

References

Bridges in Myanmar
Buildings and structures in Yangon Region